California Metal, the first of five compilation albums released by Regency Records in the late eighties, was designed primarily to showcase the talents of the numerous unsigned Christian metal bands that had arrived on the scene following the success of Stryper. California Metal was quickly followed by California Metal Volume II (1988), East Coast Metal (1988), Underground Metal (1989) and Underground Metal 2 (1989). As a bonus, another album released by Regency along the preceding metal line was Classic Metal (1990). As far as the title California Metal implies, all of the artists participating on the project come from the state and bring a variety of metal styles ranging from classic metal, melodic metal, speed metal and commercial hard rock to it. What makes California Metal such a noteworthy release, nevertheless, is the fact it introduced several bands that in time would become household names in the growing Christian rock, hard rock and metal music communities: "Gardian" (soon to correctly rename itself as "Guardian"), Deliverance and Neon Cross. Other artists participating on the project include Barren Cross (who debuted the previous year with its Star Song release "Rock For The King") and Mastedon which is the studio project of former Kansas vocalist John Elefante and his brother Dino. Hero was the only band appearing on the album not to go on and make a name for itself.

Leading up to the time of California Metal, Guardian was still in its "space metal warriors" era (the album packaging includes a photo of the band decked out in full body armor). After its demo "Rock In Victory" song from the Rock In Victory EP (1984) led to the band signing with Enigma Records, Guardian finalized its line up with the addition of guitarist Tony Palacios and was only waiting for the schedule of producer Oz Fox (Stryper) to open up before recording its full-length debut First Watch (1989).

While Hero was the only band participating on the project not to eventually sign with a label and record a full-length album, a lack of talent does not hold the band back in that it features former Holy Soldier front man Robbie Braunz.

When the album production team of John and Dino Elefante ended up one track short, they decided to add a song written for Kansas in "Wasn't It Love" (originally entitled "What About Love") under the name Mastedon. Regency Records later requested a full-length album which became Mastedon's debut It's a Jungle Out There!.

Track listing

 Note: tracks 2 & 7 are available on the Guardian demo album "Voyager" (1982) as tracks 11 & 12 respectively.
 Note: track number 6 is also available on the Christian metal compilation "Classic Metal" (1990) as track number 1.
 Note: track number 6 is now available on the 2006 re-issue of the Mastedon album "It's a Jungle Out there!" as well as on iTunes.
 Note: track number 2 is available on the Guardian album First Watch (1989) on the compact disc version only. It's track number 12.
 Note: tracks 2 & 7 are available on the Guardian album "Kingdom of Rock 1982-1989" (1996) as tracks 8 & 7.
 Note: tracks 2 & 7 are available on the Guardian album "Voyager and Fusion: The Early Years'" (2001) as tracks 11 & 12.
 Note: tracks 2 & 7 are available in re-mastered form on the Guardian album "First Watch: 20th Anniversary Edition" (2009) as tracks 13 & 14.

External links 
 Angelic Warlord Site

References

1987 compilation albums
Heavy metal compilation albums
Christian rock compilation albums